Beyond the Darkness is an album by Balzac.

Beyond the Darkness may also refer to:
 Beyond the Darkness (EP), a 2007 EP by Demonic Resurrection
 Beyond the Darkness (film), a 1979 Italian film by Joe D'Amato

See also
 Beyond Darkness